Kira Oleksandrivna Rudyk (or Rudik; ; born 14 October 1985) is a Ukrainian and European public and political figure, vice-president of the European transnational political party Alliance of Liberals and Democrats for Europe since June 4, 2022, deputy of the Verkhovna Rada of Ukraine of the 9th convocation, head of the Holos political party. She consistently advocates for Ukraine's integration into the European Union and NATO.
 
Before starting her political career, she built a successful career in the Ukrainian and American IT industries. She created the company Ring Ukraine, a branch of the American startup Ring. In 2018, she and her partners sold the company to Amazon Corporation. She was a member of the board of the American Chamber of Commerce in Ukraine and the IT Association of Ukraine.

Biography

Childhood and education 
Rudyk was born on October 14, 1985, in Uzhhorod. In 2002, she graduated with a gold medal from school No. 1 in Uzhhorod with an advanced study of the English language.

While attending school, she participated in school Olympiads in mathematics, physics, chemistry, the Ukrainian language, and other subjects. She graduated from a music school with two majors: piano and percussion instruments.

In 2008, she obtained a master's degree at the Kyiv-Mohyla Academy, defending her thesis on Automated Agent-Oriented Systems in Control Systems and Technologies.

Career and business 
In 2005, in the third year of the Kyiv-Mohyla Academy, Kira started working in the IT field at Software MacKiev. Since 2007, she tested software at TAIN Ukraine. She worked as a manager of several IT projects, in particular American MiMedia (2010—2013) and TechTeamLabs (2013—2016).

Since 2016, she has been the chief operating officer of Ring Ukraine. In 3 years, under her leadership, the company increased its staff in Ukraine from ten to a thousand employees with offices in three cities, and the company was considered the most innovative development office in Ukraine. In 2018, Ring was sold to Amazon for $1 billion, making it the second-largest asset purchase in Amazon's history.

Political activity 
In the 2019 Ukrainian parliamentary election, Kira Rudyk was elected as a deputy of the Verkhovna Rada of the IX convocation under the third number on the electoral list of the Holos. In Parliament, she became the first deputy head of the Verkhovna Rada of Ukraine Committee on Digital Transformation. She is a co-chairperson of the group on inter-parliamentary relations with Singapore.

As a member of parliament, she continues to support the IT industry and opposes tax increases for IT professionals. In addition, she is a co-author of a number of draft laws in the field of economy, social protection, animal protection. On December 12, 2019, Rudyk became the co-chair of the Humane Country association, created on the initiative of UAnimals to protect animals from cruelty.

On March 11, 2020, the congress of the Holos party elected Kira as the head of the party. Prior to that, Sviatoslav Vakarchuk was the head of the party. In July 2020, Kira Rudyk announced the transition of the party to the opposition. On September 4, 2020, Russia included Rudyk in the list of persons subject to special economic measures. Under the leadership of Kira Rudyk, the party successfully took part in the 2020 Ukrainian local elections, securing the election of more than 300 of its representatives to local councils, including in Kyiv, Lviv, Rivne and 50 other cities and communities. More than 50% of deputies elected by Holos are women.

Under the leadership of Kira Rudyk, the Holos political party became the first of the parliamentary parties of Ukraine to receive full membership in the Alliance of Liberals and Democrats for Europe (ALDE).

On June 4, 2022, she was elected vice-president of the ALDE, for the first time in history from among countries that are not members of the EU. As the vice-president of ALDE, on the eve of the decision to grant Ukraine the status of a candidate for EU membership, she made a working visit to Brussels, where she held political meetings in support of the historic decision with European parliamentarians.

Legislative activity 
Author of the draft resolution on mass testing of Ukrainian citizens for antibodies to COVID-19.
Author of amendments and proposals to the law on the land market, due to which citizens of the Russian Federation or anyone affiliated with them do not have the right to buy Ukrainian land.
Co-author of the law on supporting small and medium-sized businesses during the coronavirus pandemic, according to which the USC and any checks by fiscal authorities were canceled.
Co-author of the bill on stimulating the development of information technologies in Ukraine (alternative “Diia.City”).
Co-author of the law on e-passport and e-passport for traveling abroad.
Co-author of the law on virtual assets.
Co-author of the law on the paperless regime in public services.

Russo-Ukrainian war 
With the beginning of Russia's full-scale aggression on February 24, 2022, she takes an active part in the formation of sustainable international support for Ukraine. On the day of the Russian invasion, she was in the Verkhovna Rada, where she supported the introduction of martial law and the adoption of all bills necessary for defense.

From the first days of the war, in communication with European and American politicians and international media, she advocated for the introduction of a no-fly zone over Ukraine, and also for quickly providing Ukraine with the necessary weapons. Advocates for negotiations between Ukraine and its partners with Russia exclusively from a position of strength.

In May 2022 she was in Scotland meeting the first minister, Nicola Sturgeon. She thanked her for the support of Scotland.

In June 2022, she visited Lithuania and Sweden, had meetings with the Speaker of the Parliament of Lithuania Viktorija Čmilytė-Nielsen, the Mayor of Vilnius Remigijus Šimašius, Swedish and Lithuanian parliamentarians to strengthen support for Ukraine. She was a participant in the 75th Liberal International Congress, where she spoke in a panel discussion on security and the new world order.

She took part in the work of the European Union summit, where Ukraine received the status of a candidate for EU membership, held a meeting with French President Emmanuel Macron as part of the summit of leaders of European liberal parties.

After granting Ukraine the status of a candidate for accession to the European Union, she actively demands accelerated implementation of reforms from the Ukrainian government, primarily in the field of fighting corruption, as well as improving the quality of public administration. She advocates for the creation of a new world security system that ensures the protection of democracy from the aggression of authoritarian regimes, is convinced that Ukraine will be an integral part of such a security system.

At the international level, she is actively working on expanding programs to support Ukrainian women and children who suffered as a result of Russian aggression.

During her participation in the General Assembly of the Africa Liberal Network, Kira Rudyk said that an important task for a politician is the consolidation of political support for Ukraine from the countries of the Global South, and it is necessary to convince African liberal partners of the need for real actions to support Ukraine and international security, to call on them to defend international peace, security and territorial integrity together with us and strengthen Ukraine's position in the Global South.

She actively supports confiscation of seized Russian assets in favor of Ukraine, as well as recognition of Russia as a state sponsor of terrorism for further expansion of sanctions.

Together with Bill Browder, she participates in an advocacy campaign for the adoption of laws on the confiscation of the property of the aggressor country registered in the United States of America, Canada and Great Britain, and the sending of funds to support the Ukrainian army, Ukrainian refugees, as well as for the further recovery of the country from the consequences of the war.

At a meeting with the Speaker of the US House of Representatives Nancy Pelosi in Washington, she spoke about publicly supporting the confiscation of Russian assets in favor of Ukraine. The speaker of the US House of Representatives is known for her support of Ukraine. In particular, Nancy Pelosi made a statement that Russia should be recognized as a state sponsor of terrorism.

During a meeting with Estonian Prime Minister Kaja Kallas, Kira Rudik presented a project to confiscate Russian assets in favor of Ukraine. A team of the best experts, lawyers, and financiers has been working on this initiative for the past months, its goal is to make Russia pay for everything destroyed in Ukraine. Estonia was chosen to present the project because of the huge contribution that the Baltic countries make in supporting Ukraine.

Social activism 
Kira Rudyk promotes the issue of female leadership. In 2018, she graduated from the Stanford program for female managers, and also studied at the Aspen Institute in Ukraine (Responsible Leadership seminar). As a speaker, Kira Rudyk shares her own successful experience as a female leader, IT entrepreneur, and politician at numerous events dedicated to equality and female leadership.

Since living in Uzhhorod, Kira Rudyk has been involved in the protection of homeless animals and has her own animal shelter. As the director of Ring Ukraine, Kira Rudyk encouraged charitable activities. The company actively helped orphanages and homes for the elderly. Rudyk also initiated the creation of a "network of grandmothers" (a group of retired people) who take care of animals for an additional fee until they find new owners.

After the full-scale invasion of Russia on February 24, 2022, she initiated 4 major humanitarian projects to support Ukrainians affected by the war. 
Ukraine is a Big Family, aimed at supporting large families. Thanks to the initiative, more than 7,000 families have already received financial assistance from American and European families.
There Will Be Joy. This project is aimed at supporting women and girls who suffered from psychological and physical violence by the occupiers. Hundreds of girls have already received psychological help, financial support, personal hygiene items, etc. 
Graduate and Return. A joint project of providing free international education to Ukrainian students with Ukrainian partners and more than 100 of the best world universities. 
Breadwinner. A project to support Ukrainian female entrepreneurs who became the sole breadwinners of their families due to the war. Thanks to the collection of donations and the hosting of charity auctions, female entrepreneurs receive media support and grants for the development of their own business.

Media activity 

Since the beginning of full-scale Russian aggression, Kira Rudyk has been conducting an active information campaign in the leading mass media of the United States and Europe in support of Ukraine, advocating the provision of large-scale military, financial and political support to the country.

Appeared on CNN, Fox News, NBC, MSNBC, Newsmax, BBC World, Sky News, GB News, Times Radio, Polsat, TVP World, Talk TV, Al Jazeera, CBC, ABC News, Bloomberg, BFM TV, LBC, LCI, CTV, RTE Ireland and other leading information platforms, gave interviews to leading publications in the United States, Great Britain and Poland.

Awards and ratings
In November 2022, Kira Rudik received the Women In Politics Champion of the Year Award from The Alliance of Her.
Top-100 Ranking of Promising Ukrainian Politicians (No. 2 on the list) according to gazeta.ua — 2021.
Top 100 Successful Women of Ukraine according to the version of the "NV" magazine — 2019, 2020, 2021.
Top 80 Most Influential People of Ukraine according to Focus magazine — 2020, 2021.
Top 35 Most Influential Women of Ukraine according to Focus magazine — 2020, 2021
Top 33 Best Managers of Ukraine according to Focus magazine — 2019.
Top 100 Most Influential Women of Ukraine according to Focus magazine — 2019.

References

1985 births
21st-century Ukrainian women politicians
People from Uzhhorod
Living people
Voice (Ukrainian political party) politicians
Leaders of political parties in Ukraine
National University of Kyiv-Mohyla Academy alumni
Ukrainian women in business
Ninth convocation members of the Verkhovna Rada
Women members of the Verkhovna Rada